Algoa Basin is a sedimentary basin offshore Algoa Bay in South Africa. The basin depression is a rift currently filled with sediments of Lower Cretaceous age. Kirkwood Formation makes up part of the fill of Algoa Basin.

References

Geology of South Africa
Mesozoic rifts and grabens
Sedimentary basins of Africa